The 1980 Algerian Cup Final was the 19th final of the Algerian Cup. The final took place on June 19, 1980, at Stade du 5 Juillet in Algiers. EP Sétif beat USK Alger 1-0 to win their fifth Algerian Cup.

Pre-match

Details

See also
 1979–80 Algerian Championnat National
 1979–80 Algerian Cup

References

Cup
Algeria
Algerian Cup Finals
ES Sétif matches
USM Alger matches